Roya TV is a Jordanian private independent satellite TV channel, based in Amman and owned by Sayegh Group.

History and editorial policy 

Roya TV was launched on January 1, 2011, with an operational mandate of targeting family and youth, promoting democracy, focusing on outreach activities to remote areas in the country, creating awareness on human rights, and empowering women.

Programming 
Roya TV's general programming consists of four periods: morning, mid-day, afternoon, and evening; with a greater part of the content based on live shows. In 2012, Deema Hijjawi joined the Roya TV channel, to present a morning cookery program Dunya Ya Dunya.

References

External links

2011 establishments in Jordan
Arabic-language television stations
Television channels and stations established in 2011
Television channels in Jordan